The  is a concept car that was revealed in early February 2007 by Japanese manufacturer Mazda. Its major design elements come from a new design language developed by Mazda called Nagare, designed by Laurens van den Acker, which also designed other Mazda concepts, and most notably the Renault Clio and Renault Captur.   This element has been used on past Mazda concept cars such as: Mazda Nagare; Mazda Ryuga; Mazda Kabura.

Niche
It was designed to have the looks of a coupe, the functionality of a Crossover SUV or CUV, while having the driving capabilities of a roadster.

Features
The car has no door handles, cameras in place of mirrors, lighting effects, scissor doors, and a partially removable roof.

Interior
Inside it has four bucket seats, making somewhat of a 2+2 format.  There is a wrap-around center console.  Everything inside can be adjusted to the driver's specific needs; once they are set the settings are stored in a Bluetooth card that the driver keeps possession of.  When the driver activates the car using the card, all his/her personal preferences are automatically adjusted.

References 

Hakaze